Baruscapillaria is a genus of nematodes belonging to the family Capillariidae.

The species of this genus are found in North America.

Species:

Baruscapillaria anseris 
Baruscapillaria appendiculata 
Baruscapillaria belopolskaiae 
Baruscapillaria carbonis 
Baruscapillaria cylindrica 
Baruscapillaria emberizae 
Baruscapillaria falconis 
Baruscapillaria longevaginata 
Baruscapillaria obsignata 
Baruscapillaria obsignata 
Baruscapillaria ovopunctata 
Baruscapillaria picorum 
Baruscapillaria podicipitis 
Baruscapillaria ransomia 
Baruscapillaria resecta 
Baruscapillaria rudolphii 
Baruscapillaria spiculata 
Baruscapillaria tiaras

References

Nematodes